

Biology and ecology
Decomposition is the process through which organic matter is broken down into simpler molecules.

Decomposition, decompose may also refer to:

Chemistry
Chemical decomposition or analysis, in chemistry, is the fragmentation of a chemical compound into elements or smaller compounds
Thermal decomposition, a chemical decomposition caused by heat

Mathematics
Doob decomposition of an integrable, discrete-time stochastic process
Doob–Meyer decomposition of a continuous-time sub- or supermartingale
Hahn decomposition of a measure space
Hahn–Jordan decomposition of a signed measure
Helmholtz decomposition, decomposition of a vector field
Indecomposability (disambiguation)
Indecomposable continuum
Lebesgue's decomposition theorem, decomposition of a measure
Lie group decomposition, used to analyse the structure of Lie groups and associated objects
Manifold decomposition, decomposition of manifolds
JSJ decomposition, or toral decomposition, a decomposition of 3-manifolds
Matrix decomposition, decomposition of matrices
Primary decomposition, decomposition of ideals into primary ideals
Vector decomposition, decomposition of vectors
Permutation decomposition, decomposition of a permutation into disjoint cycles

Physics
Spinodal decomposition, phase separation mechanism

Other uses
Decomposition (computer science), or factoring; the process of breaking a complex problem down into easily understood and achievable parts
Semantic decomposition, used in natural language processing
Decompositions: Volume Number One, the second studio album by American screamo band Circle Takes the Square
 Zersetzung, or decomposition, a debilitative psychological warfare technique utilised by the Stasi intelligence agency in East Germany

See also
Component (disambiguation)
Composition (disambiguation)
Decay (disambiguation)
Decomposition method (disambiguation)
Food spoilage